Lamyropappus is a genus of flowering plants in the family Asteraceae.

Species
There is only one known species, Lamyropappus schakaptaricus, native to Kazakhstan.

References

Cynareae
Flora of Kazakhstan
Monotypic Asteraceae genera